Alpura is a village situated in the Madhubani district of Bihar, India.

References 
List of Census Villages mapped for Village Panchayat:NANAUR,ANDHRATHARHI,MADHUBANI,BIHAR. Ministry of Panchayati Raj. Retrieved on 2008-05-11.

Villages in Madhubani district